Andres Battad (born 5 June 1964) is a Filipino tennis coach and former professional player.

Battad, a resident of Hong Kong since 1991, was a national tennis player for the Philippines in the 1980s and is originally from Cotabato on the island of Mindanao. He was runner-up to Tintus Arianto Wibowo at the 1987 Southeast Asian Games and a playing member of the Philippines Davis Cup team in both 1987 and 1988.

Now working as a tennis coach, Battad trained British player Tara Moore while she lived in Hong Kong and has also worked with Hong Kong number one Venise Chan.

References

External links
 
 
 

1964 births
Living people
Filipino male tennis players
Hong Kong people of Filipino descent
People from Cotabato
Southeast Asian Games medalists in tennis
Southeast Asian Games silver medalists for the Philippines
Competitors at the 1987 Southeast Asian Games
Competitors at the 1989 Southeast Asian Games